Untold Story is the debut studio album by American rapper the Game. It was released independently on October 5, 2004 by Get Low Recordz. The album features guest appearances from Sean T and JT the Bigga Figga, among others.

A sequel to the album, titled Untold Story, Vol. 2, released the following year.

Critical reception

Untold Story was met with mixed reviews from music critics.
While his technical abilities and personality were praised, his lyrics, production and similarities to contemporaries such as Daz Dillinger and Lloyd Banks were criticized.

Commercial performance
Untold Story debuted at 146 on the Billboard 200 chart, with approximately 8,000 copies sold in its first week. As of 2005, it had sold 82,000 copies in the United States.

Track listing

Charts

Weekly charts

References

2004 debut albums
The Game (rapper) albums